Pseudophoenix vinifera (Dominican Spanish: cacheo, Haitian Creole: katié) is a palm species endemic to the Caribbean island of Hispaniola, in the Dominican Republic and Haiti.

Uses
Pseudophoenix vinifera was once used in palm wine production. Trees were cut down and the pith was extracted, especially from the swollen portion of the stem. Sap was then extracted and fermented.

References

vinifera
Flora of Hispaniola
Trees of Haiti 
Trees of the Dominican Republic 
Taxa named by Odoardo Beccari